Ben Rivers (born 1972) is an artist and experimental filmmaker based in London, England. His work has been screened at film festivals and galleries around the world and have won numerous awards. Rivers' work ranges in themes, including exploring unknown wilderness territories to candid and intimate portraits of real-life subjects.

Life and career
Rivers studied fine art at Falmouth University. His practice as a filmmaker treads a line between documentary and fiction. Often following and filming people who have in some way separated themselves from society, the raw film footage provides Rivers with a starting point for creating oblique narratives imagining alternative existences in marginal worlds. Rivers often employs analogue media and hand develops 16mm film, which shows the evidence of the elements it has been exposed to – the materiality of this medium forming part of the narrative.

Rivers's first feature-length film, Two Years at Sea, was presented in September 2011 in the Orizzonti section at the 68th Venice International Film Festival and won the FIPRESCI International Critics prize. His second feature, A Spell to Ward Off the Darkness, was made in collaboration with American filmmaker Ben Russell, a frequent collaborator, and premiered at Locarno Film Festival 2013. 

His feature films are distributed in the United Kingdom by SODA Pictures, Cinema Guild and KimStim in North America.

Rivers is represented by Kate MacGarry Gallery, London. His most recent feature directed in collaboration with Thai filmmaker Anocha Suwichakornpong Krabi, 2562 (2019) premiered at Locarno Film Festival. Rivers is a Media City Film Festival Chrysalis Fellowship recipient (2020), after screening his work at the festival since the early aughts.

Shows
"Nought to Sixty" ICA, London, 2008. 
"Wild Shapes" – group show, Cell Project Space, London, 2008. 
"A World Rattled of Habit" – solo show, A Foundation, Liverpool, 2009.
"Slow Action" – solo show, Gallery TPW, Toronto 2011 and Matt's Gallery, London 2011.
"Heather and Ivan Morison, Ben Rivers and David Thorpe" – Hepworth Wakefield 2012.
"Ah, Liberty!" – solo show, Douglas Hyde Gallery, Dublin 2013.
"Fable" – solo show, Temporary Gallery, Cologne 2014.
"Things" – solo show, Kate MacGarry Gallery, London 2014.

Artist-in-focus screenings and retrospectives include Courtisane Festival; Pesaro International Film Festival; London Film Festival; Tirana Film Festival; Punto de Vista Pamplona; and Karlovy Vary International Film Festival

Filmography

Awards
2007: London Artists Film and Video Award.
2008: Tiger Award for Short Film, International Film Festival Rotterdam
2008: Vauxhall Collective Commission.
2009: Film London Artist's Moving Image Network production.
2010: Shortlisted for the Jarman Award.
2010: Paul Hamlyn Award for Artists.
2011: Baloise Art Prize, Art Basel.
2011: FIPRESCI, International Critics Prize, 68th Venice Film Festival
2012: Shortlisted for the Jarman Award.
2012: Robert Gardner film award.
2013: Artangel Open 
2014: Tiger Award for Short Film, International Film Festival Rotterdam
2020: Media City Film Festival Chrysalis Fellowship

References

External links
 
 Kate MacGarry Gallery  
 Cinemascope interview
 BOMB magazine interview
 Vimeo page

1972 births
Living people
English experimental filmmakers
Film people from London
Bâloise Prize winners
Radcliffe fellows
Media Wave Award winners
English contemporary artists
Alumni of Falmouth University